An Dong-hyeok (Hanja: 安東赫;  born 11 November 1988) is a South Korean footballer who plays as a midfielder.

Club career
An was selected in the priority pick of the 2011 K-League Draft by Gwangju FC.

References

External links 
 

1988 births
Living people
South Korean footballers
Association football midfielders
Gwangju FC players
FC Anyang players
Seoul E-Land FC players
K League 1 players
K League 2 players
Korea National League players